Aphanostephus skirrhobasis, common name Arkansas lazydaisy, is a North American species of flowering plants in the family Asteraceae. It is native primarily to the southern Great Plains of the United States (Texas, Oklahoma, eastern New Mexico, southern Kansas, southwestern Missouri, western Arkansas, western Louisiana) with additional populations in Florida and the Mexican state of Tamaulipas.
 
Aphanostephus skirrhobasis is an annual plant up to 45 cm (18 inches) tall.
Varieties
 Aphanostephus skirrhobasis var. kidderi (S.F.Blake) B.L.Turner - sandy and gravelly soils, Texas and Tamaulipas
 Aphanostephus skirrhobasis var. skirrhobasis - most of species range except Florida + Tamaulipas
 Aphanostephus skirrhobasis var. thalassius Shinners - coastal sand dunes in Florida, Louisiana, Texas, Tamaulipas

References

External links
Lady Bird Johnson Wildflower Center, University of Texas
9 photos on Flickr

Astereae
Flora of the Great Plains (North America)
Flora of the United States
Flora of the Southeastern United States
Flora of Tamaulipas
Plants described in 1836
Taxa named by Augustin Pyramus de Candolle
Flora without expected TNC conservation status
Taxa named by William Trelease